Trout Lake is a lake situated in Annapolis County, Nova Scotia, at an elevation of approximately .

References

Lakes of Nova Scotia
Landforms of Annapolis County, Nova Scotia